is a Japanese politician of the New Komeito Party, a member of the House of Representatives in the Diet (national legislature). A native of Kōchi, he attended the University of Electro-Communications as undergraduate and received a master's degree from Soka University. After that, he worked at the government of Tokyo from 1979 to 1988. He was elected to the House of Representatives for the first time in 1990.

References

External links 
  in Japanese.

1951 births
Living people
People from Kōchi, Kōchi
Members of the House of Representatives (Japan)
New Komeito politicians
21st-century Japanese politicians